Earl Hines at Sundown is an album by pianist Earl Hines recorded in France in 1974 for the Black & Blue label.

Reception

Allmusic reviewer Ken Dryden stated: "The pianist is in terrific form on At Sundown... an excellent example of Hines' productive final years".

Track listing
 "There Will Never Be Another You" (Harry Warren, Mack Gordon) - 8:20 
 "At Sundown" (Walter Donaldson) - 9:33  
 "Love Me or Leave Me" (Donaldson, Gus Kahn) - 7:11  
 "I Hadn't Anyone Till You" (Ray Noble) - 4:12  
 "Velvet Moon" (Eddie DeLange, Josef Myrow) - 5:26

Personnel 
Earl Hines - piano
Jimmy Leary - bass
Panama Francis - drums

References 

1974 albums
Earl Hines albums
Black & Blue Records albums